Shinewater is a part of Langney electoral ward in Eastbourne,  East Sussex.  In 1995 during the clearing of the Hydneye lake a Bronze Age settlement was discovered.

The remains of a Late Bronze Age platform were uncovered after work began digging the Hydneye lake as part of wider work to alleviate potential flooding.  Initially in 1995 a 50m section of the platform was found.  The following year a 60m section of trackway was found.

Additional finds included a bronze sickle with intact handle and three hearths set on clay, along with pottery belonging to the Late Bronze Age post Deverel-Rimbury tradition and large numbers of stone finds.

East Sussex County Council engaged in landscaping of the area in association with opening of Golden Jubilee Way. Shinewater Park continues to be run and managed by Eastbourne Borough Council and East Sussex County Council. It won a Commendation from The Civic Trust in 2004.

References 

Eastbourne
Bronze Age sites in East Sussex